Pothumarru is a village in Kalidindi mandal, located in Krishna district of the Indian state of Andhra Pradesh.

Geography

Pothumarru is located at 16°31'46"N 81°18'46"E.

References 

Villages in Krishna district